The women's  +67 kg competition of the taekwondo events at the 2013 Mediterranean Games took place on the 23 of June at the Edip Buran Arena.

Schedule
All times are Eastern European Summer Time (UTC+3).

Results

Legend
PTG — Won by Points Gap
SUP — Won by Superiority
OT — Won on over time (Golden Point)

Main bracket

References

Taekwondo at the 2013 Mediterranean Games
Med